The seriemas are the sole living members of the small bird family Cariamidae, which is also the only surviving lineage of the order Cariamiformes. Once believed to be related to cranes, they have been placed near the falcons, parrots and passerines, as well as the extinct Phorusrhacidae (terror birds). They live in grasslands, savanna, dry woodland and open forests of Brazil, Bolivia, Argentina, Paraguay and Uruguay. There are two species of seriemas, the red-legged seriema (Cariama cristata) and the black-legged seriema (Chunga burmeisteri). Names for these birds in the Tupian languages are variously spelled as siriema, sariama, and çariama, and mean "crested".

Description
They forage on foot and run from danger rather than fly (though they can fly for short distances, and they roost in trees). They have long legs, necks, and tails, but only short wings, reflecting their way of life. They are among the largest ground-dwelling birds endemic of the Neotropics (only behind rheas).

They are brownish birds with short bills and erectile crests, found on fairly dry open country, the red-legged seriema preferring grasslands and the black-legged seriema preferring scrub and open woodland. They give loud, yelping calls and are often heard before they are seen. They have sharp claws, with an extensible and very curved second toe claw.

Classification

Several other related groups, such as the idiornithids and bathornithids were part of Palaeogene faunas in North America and Europe and possibly elsewhere too. However, the fossil record of the seriemas themselves is poor, with two prehistoric species, Chunga incerta  and Miocariama patagonica (formerly Noriegavis santacrucensis), both from the Miocene of Argentina, having been described to date. Some of the fossils from the Eocene fauna of the Messel Pit (i.e. Salimia and Idiornis) have also been suggested to be seriemas, as has the massive predatory Paracrax from the Oligocene of North America, though their status remains uncertain.

Extant Species
There are two living species of seriemas.

Behaviour and ecology
Ecologically, the seriema is the South American counterpart of the African secretary bird. They feed on insects, snakes, lizards, frogs, young birds, and rodents, with small amounts of plant food (including maize and beans). They often associate with grazing livestock, probably to take insects the animals disturb. When seriemas catch small reptiles, they beat the prey on the ground (Redford and Peters 1986) or throw it at a hard surface to break resistance and also the bones. If the prey is too large to swallow whole, it will be ripped into smaller pieces with a sickle claw by holding the prey in the beak and tearing it apart with the claw.

Because of these feeding behaviors, seriemas are important by eating detritivores and helping the soil get more nutrients from dead plant matter.

In contact with humans, seriemas are suspicious and if they feel threatened, usually spread their wings and face them. They walk in pairs or small groups. Although perfectly capable of flying, they prefer to spend most of their time on land. They only take flight when necessary, for example to escape a predator. Overnight they take shelter in the treetops, where they also build their nests.

Breeding
The breeding biology of the seriemas is poorly known, and much of what is known comes only from red-legged seriemas. Pairs appear to be territorial and avoid others of their species while breeding, and fights between rivals have been observed. These fights involving kicking rivals, can go on for long periods of time, and involve much calling by the involved birds.

The placement of the nest is so that the adults can reach the nest by foot rather than flying, through hops and the occasional flutter. Both sexes are involved in building the nest. They lay two or three white or buff eggs sparsely spotted with brown and purple. The female does most of the incubation, which lasts from 24 to 30 days. Hatchlings are downy but stay in the nest for about two weeks; after which they leave the nest and follow both parents. They reach full maturity at the age of four to five months. It is unknown when fledgling chicks reach sexual maturity.

References

External links

Seriema videos on the Internet Bird Collection

Birds of Argentina

 
Extant Miocene first appearances
Higher-level bird taxa restricted to the Neotropics
Langhian first appearances
 
Taxa named by Charles Lucien Bonaparte